Luxembourg competed at the 1912 Summer Olympics in Stockholm, Sweden.  It was the first official appearance at the modern Olympic Games for the nation, although it was later discovered that one Luxembourgish athlete competed in 1900.

Athletics

Two athletes represented Luxembourg in the nation's Olympic debut. Pelletier's 17th-place finish in the shot put was Luxembourg's best placement.

Ranks given are within that athlete's heat for running events.

Gymnastics 
all-around
 Antoine Wehrer - 15th, 117.25 points
 Pierre Hentges - 18th, 115.50 points
 Jean-Pierre Thommes - 22nd, 110.75 points
 François Hentges - 23rd, 110.50 points
 Emile Lanners - 24th, 109.75 points
team, European system

fourth place, 35.95 points
 Nicolas Adam
 Charles Behm
 André Bordang
 Michel Hemmerling
 François Hentges
 Pierre Hentges
 Jean-Baptiste Horn
 Nicolas Kanivé
 Nicolas Kummer
 Marcel Langsam
 Emile Lanners
 Jean-Pierre Thommes
 François Wagner
 Antoine Wehrer
 Ferd Wirtz
 Joseph Zuang
team, free system

fifth place, 16.30 points
 Nicolas Adam
 Charles Behm
 André Bordang
 Jean-Pierre Frantzen
 Michel Hemmerling
 François Hentges
 Pierre Hentges
 Jean-Baptiste Horn
 Nicolas Kanivé
 Émile Knepper
 Nicolas Kummer
 Marcel Langsam
 Emile Lanners
 Maurice Palgen
 Jean-Pierre Thommes
 François Wagner
 Antoine Wehrer
 Ferd Wirtz
 Joseph Zuang

References
Official Olympic Reports

Nations at the 1912 Summer Olympics
1912
Olympics